This article is about the particular significance of the year 1987 to Wales and its people.

Incumbents

Secretary of State for Wales – Nicholas Edwards (until 13 June); Peter Walker
Archbishop of Wales – George Noakes, Bishop of St David's (elected)
Archdruid of the National Eisteddfod of Wales
Elerydd (outgoing)
Emrys Deudraeth (incoming)

Events
12 January - The lowest daytime maximum temperature ever recorded in Wales (-8.0 °C) is recorded at Trecastle, Powys.
12 February - The Roman Catholic Church in Wales creates a new Diocese of Wrexham and moves the Diocese of Menevia to Swansea.
5 March - The High Court declares Dorothy Squires a vexatious litigant.
15 March - Roy Jenkins is elected Chancellor of the University of Oxford.
14 April - Oakwood Leisure Park opens near Narberth, Pembrokeshire.
7 May - District council elections take place across Wales (and England). The Conservatives lose control of Cardiff City Council.
24 May - Neil Kinnock is interviewed by David Frost about Labour's defence policy and plans for government.
28 May - The Mametz Wood Memorial, sculpted by David Petersen, is unveiled in Cardiff.
11 June - In the general election
Plaid Cymru's Ieuan Wyn Jones wins the seat of Ynys Môn from the Conservatives.  Plaid retain their other two parliamentary seats.
Alun Michael replaces James Callaghan as MP for Cardiff South.
Labour's Paul Flynn wins back Newport West from the Conservatives.
11 July - The Mametz Wood Memorial is dedicated at the site of the Royal Welch Fusiliers battle of 1916 in France.
5 October - Keith Best, former Conservative MP for Ynys Môn, having been sentenced to four months' imprisonment for share-dealing activities, has his sentence quashed by the Court of Appeal after serving five days.
19 October - Four people are killed in the Glanrhyd Bridge collapse, when a train falls into the swollen River Tywi, as a result of the flooding that affects many parts of Wales.  
20 November - Roy Jenkins becomes Baron Jenkins of Hillhead.
22 November - The Welsh language is used within the Vatican for the first time on an official occasion, as part of a beatification ceremony for three Welsh martyrs.
date unknown
Creation of the Cardiff Bay Development Corporation.
Chris Loyn establishes the architectural practice Loyn & Co in Penarth.
The National Trust buys Dinefwr Park in Llandeilo, including the deer park.

Arts and literature
Jim Burns becomes the first non-American to win the Hugo Award for Best Professional Artist.

Awards
National Eisteddfod of Wales (held in Porthmadog)
National Eisteddfod of Wales: Chair - Ieuan Wyn
National Eisteddfod of Wales: Crown - John Griffith Jones
National Eisteddfod of Wales: Prose Medal - Margiad Williams

New books

English language
Dannie Abse - Ask the Bloody Horse
Rees Davies - Wales: The Age Of Conquest, 1063-1415
Stephen Gregory - The Cormorant
Douglas Houston - With the Offal Eaters
J. Beverley Smith - Llywelyn ap Gruffudd
Frances Thomas - Seeing Things
Peter Thomas - Strangers from a Secret Land
R. S. Thomas - Welsh Airs

Welsh language
Euros Bowen - Oes y Medwsa
T. Glynne Davies - Cerddi
Dafydd Glyn Jones - Drych yr Amseroedd 
Nesta Wyn Jones - Rhwng Chwerthin a Chrio
Alan Llwyd - Barddoniaeth y Chwedegau
Gwylon Phillips - Llofruddiaeth Shadrach Lewis
Rhydwen Williams - Amser i Wylo

Music
3 December - Indian classical musician Ram Narayan records his album Rag Lalit at Wyastone Leys near Monmouth.
MusicFest Aberystwyth is founded by cellist Nicholas Jones.
The Alarm - Eye Of The Hurricane (album)
Anrhefn - Defaid Skateboard a Wellies
Y Cyrff - Y Testament Newydd (EP)
Frank Hennessy - Thoughts and Memories (album)
Karl Wallinger - Private Revolution (album)

Film
Timothy Dalton makes his debut as James Bond in The Living Daylights.
On the Black Hill, adapted from the novel by Bruce Chatwin and set in Wales, stars Bob Peck, Gemma Jones and Mike Gwilym.

Broadcasting

English-language radio
John Humphrys becomes a regular presenter on BBC Radio 4's Today programme.

Welsh-language television
Ioan Gruffudd joins the cast of Pobol y Cwm.

Sport
BBC Wales Sports Personality of the Year - Ian Woosnam.
Golf - David Llewellyn and Ian Woosnam win golf's World Cup in Hawaii.
Rugby union
Wales finish 4th in the 1987 Five Nations Championship with just a single win, over England.
Wales finish third, their best ever position, in the first Rugby World Cup.
5 April - Pontypool Park hosts the first international for the Wales women's national rugby union team who lose 22–4 to England.
Skiing - Dry ski slope opened on the Great Orme at Llandudno.

Births
9 January - Bradley Davies, rugby union player
21 January - Joe Ledley, footballer
24 January - Wayne Hennessey, footballer
14 February - Lee Selby, World champion boxer
24 March - Rob Davies, footballer
27 March - Adam Davies, footballer
April - Hannah Stone, harpist
8 May - Aneurin Barnard, actor
23 August - Alexandra Roach, actress
4 September - Mike O'Shea, cricketer
29 September - Claire Williams, athlete
21 October - Steph Davies, cricketer
30 November - Victoria Thornley, Olympic rower

Deaths
5 January - Brinley Williams, Wales dual-code rugby international, 91
21 January - Donald Holroyde Hey, chemist, 83
4 February - Wynford Vaughan-Thomas, writer and broadcaster, 78
7 March - E. D. Jones, librarian, 83
4 April - Richard Ithamar Aaron, philosopher, 85
13 April - Alfred Evans, Labour MP, 73
19 April - Stan Richards, footballer, 70
22 May - Keidrych Rhys, poet and editor
22 June - William Price, footballer, 83
20 August - Dorothy Rees, politician, 89
4 September - Richard Marquand, film director, 49 (stroke)
11 September - Hugh David, television director, 62
25 September - Emlyn Williams, dramatist and actor, 81
5 November - Howard Davies, rugby player, 70
date unknown - Clifford Williams, politician, Labour MP for Abertillery 1965–1970

See also
1987 Cardiff City Council election
1987 in Northern Ireland

Notes

 
Wales
 Wales